First Presbyterian Church is a historic church at 716 College Avenue in Racine, Wisconsin, United States. It was built in 1852 and was added to the National Register of Historic Places in 1973. It was designed by Lucas Bradley.

History
The First Presbyterian Church was among the first religious institutions to be created in Racine. The church was founded in 1839, two years prior to the official incorporation of the village of Racine. In its first years, it frequently outgrew its established meeting places: first a schoolhouse on Main Street between Second and Third Streets, then the unoccupied upper floor of the town jail. The congregation's first church building was dedicated in February 1843. In 1850 the congregation's pastor, the Reverend T.M. Hopkins, and later his successor Rev. Z.M. Humphrey, solicited funds to construct a larger house of worship on the southern edge of the city. The building's cornerstone was laid at 7th Street and College Avenue on May 6, 1851, and the finished building was dedicated June 10, 1852.

The building was designed in a Greek Revival style by architect and church elder Lucas Bradley. Several women in the congregation provided room and board to the builders who constructed the church. The total cost of construction was totaled at $10,600, on top of the $1,200 paid for the land. The church holds 156 pews, 138 on the ground floor and 18 in the balcony. A bell was added to the tower in 1855, which doubled as the city's fire alarm. The church's current organ was purchased in 1886.

References

Churches in Racine, Wisconsin
Greek Revival church buildings in Wisconsin
Presbyterian churches in Wisconsin
Churches on the National Register of Historic Places in Wisconsin
Churches completed in 1852
National Register of Historic Places in Racine County, Wisconsin
1839 establishments in Wisconsin Territory
Tourist attractions in Racine, Wisconsin